José de Armendáriz y Perurena, 1st Marquis of Castelfuerte (sometimes marqués de Castel-Fuerte) (? in Ribaforada, Navarre – 1740 in probably in Madrid) was a Spanish soldier and colonial administrator. From May 14, 1724 to February 4, 1736 he was viceroy of Peru.

Early career
He entered the military and fought in the War of the Spanish Succession, on the side of Philip V of Spain. He saw action in the campaigns in Naples, Sardinia, Rosellón and Catalonia, and in the siege of Gibraltar. Philip granted him the title of marquess of Castelfuerte on June 5, 1711. He was governor of Tarragona and captain general of Guipúzcoa. He was appointed a member of the Order of the Golden Fleece in 1737 on his return to Spain, and was also awarded the Order of Santiago.

As viceroy of Peru
In 1723 Philip named him viceroy of Peru, a position which he took up in May of the following year. His term in office was distinguished by a campaign against fraud and corruption in the government, and reform of the royal treasury and tax collection. He took steps to strengthen the mita, the forced labor of Indigenous in the silver mines, and thus to stimulate the production of the metal. He sent to jail the Count of San Juan de Lurigancho, director of the mint, as well as the assayer, for producing false coins. In order to fight smuggling (especially of silver), he reorganized the navy and fortified the coasts.

He reestablished the system whereby Inca nobles who could prove their ancestry were recognized as hijosdalgos of Castile. This led to a frenzy on the part of the Indigenous nobility to legitimate their status.

In 1724 society in Lima discovered an exotic drink — coffee. One patron commented, "The new drink is as bitter as the new viceroy".

The Comunero Revolt in Paraguay
During this time the Comunero Revolt broke out in Paraguay. The governor of Paraguay, Diego de los Reyes Balmaseda, was an unpopular supporter of the Jesuits. A predecessor of Viceroy Armendáriz, Carmine Nicolao Caracciolo, sent an inspector there in 1721 to look into the matter. The inspector was José de Antequera y Castro. Antequera, however, gained the support of the comuneros, challenged royal authority, imprisoned Reyes Balmaceda and expelled the Jesuits. (The Jesuits were unpopular because they sheltered many Indians from forced labor.) Antequera defeated a royalist force from Buenos Aires under García Ros.

In 1724, Armendáriz, now the viceroy in Lima, ordered Buenos Aires governor Bruno Mauricio de Zabala to suppress the rebellion and send Antequera to Lima for trial. Antequera's followers deserted him, and he was forced to flee to a convent in Cordóba in March 1725. He was arrested at Chuquisaca in Charcas, and taken to Lima. He was eventually brought to trial, and in 1731 he was beheaded. However another revolt broke out in Paraguay in 1730, under Fernando Mompó de Zayas. Mompó asserted the sovereignty of the people over the king.

Armendáriz faced other rebellions as well. The first uprising of the Chiriguanos, led by Aruma, occurred in 1727. In 1730 there was an insurrection in Oropesa, led by the Mestizo Alejo Calatayud.

End of his term
In 1736 Armendáriz turned over the office to his successor, José Antonio de Mendoza, 3rd Marquis of Villagarcía. The ex-viceroy returned to Spain, became captain of the king's guard, and was elected a Knight of the Order of the Golden Fleece in 1737. He died in 1740 without descendants.

External links

 Short biography (Archived 2009-10-31)
About the insurrection in Paraguay
 His administration

Year of birth missing
1740 deaths
Marquesses of Spain
Viceroys of Peru
Knights of the Golden Fleece of Spain
Knights of Santiago
People from Tudela (comarca)
Spanish soldiers
18th-century Spanish nobility
People from the Kingdom of Navarre